The Great Law of Subordination Consider'd; Or, the Insolence and Unsufferable Behaviour of SERVANTS in England Duly Enquired is a 1724 pamphlet by Daniel Defoe. Similarly to Every-body's Business, Is No-body's Business (1725), it focuses on issues related to servants. It also revises themes which its author had already dealt with in An Essay Upon Projects (1697).

See also
 Every-body's Business, Is No-body's Business (1725) by Daniel Defoe

References

Bibliography
Backscheider, P B, Daniel Defoe.His Life, The Johns Hopkins University Press, Baltimore and London, 1989.

“Social Projects”, Daniel Defoe. The Collection of the Lily Library, Indiana University Bloomington, 2008, retrieved 25 October 2015, <http://www.indiana.edu/~liblilly/defoe/projects.html> 
 
George, M D, London Life in the Eighteenth Century, Penguin Books, Great Britain, 1979.

Maldonado, T, “Defoe and the ‘Projecting Age’”,MIT Press, vol. 18, no. 1, 2002, pp. 78-85, retrieved 20 October 2015, JSTOR, <https://www.jstor.org/stable/1512032>

Novak, M E, “Last Productive Years”,Daniel Defoe Master of Fictions. His Life and Ideas, Oxford University Press, United States of America, 2001.

External links
 Daniel Defoe. The Collection of the Lily Library
 The Great Law of Subordination Consider'd by Daniel Defoe in the HaithiTrust Digital Library

Pamphlets
Works by Daniel Defoe
1724 books